Vega (or , or   meaning "Advanced generation European carrier rocket"), is an expendable launch system in use by Arianespace jointly developed by the Italian Space Agency (ASI) and the European Space Agency (ESA). Development began in 1998 and the first launch took place from the Centre Spatial Guyanais on 13 February 2012.

It is designed to launch small payloads — 300 to 2500 kg satellites for scientific and Earth observation missions to polar and low Earth orbits. The reference Vega mission is a polar orbit bringing a spacecraft of 1500 kg to an altitude of 700 km.

The rocket, named after Vega, the brightest star in the constellation Lyra, is a single-body launcher (no strap-on boosters) with three solid rocket stages: the P80 first stage, the Zefiro 23 second stage, and the Zefiro 9 third stage. The upper module is a liquid rocket called AVUM. The improved version of the P80 stage, the P120C, will be used as the side boosters of the Ariane 6. Italy is the leading contributor to the Vega program (65%), followed by France (13%). Other participants include Spain, Belgium, the Netherlands, Switzerland and Sweden.

Launch statistics

Rocket configurations

Launch outcomes

Orbits

Past launches 

Note: Date and time of start (as count-down zero, ignition or lift-off?) is listed in UTC. (Although local time at Guiana Space Centre (CSG) in Kourou, French Guiana, South America is UTC–3.)

2012

2013

2014

2015

2016

2017

2018

2019

2020

2021

2022

Future launches

2023

2024

2025

2026

2027

2028

2029

See also 

 List of Falcon 1 launches
 List of Electron launches
 Falcon 1
 PSLV

Notes

References 

Vega